Hospitāļu iela is a Latvian band formed in 1997. The core member of the band is songwriter and singer Edgars Šubrovskis.

Discography

Albums

Videography

Music videos

Latvian reggae musical groups